Fenouilia is a genus of small freshwater snails with gills and an operculum, aquatic gastropod mollusks in the family Pomatiopsidae.

Species 
Species within the genus Fenouilia include:
 Fenouilia kreitneri Neumayr, 1880

References

Further reading 
 Heude P. M. (1890). "Notes sur les mollusques terrestres de la valée du fleuve bleu. Mollusques d'eau douce". Mémoires concernant l'histoire naturelle de l'empire chinois par des pères de la Compagnie de Jésus, Chang-Hai, 125-180, plates 33-42.

Pomatiopsidae
Taxa named by Pierre Marie Heude
Taxonomy articles created by Polbot